Highway 104 (AR 104, Ark. 104, and Hwy. 104) is an east–west state highway in Jefferson County, Arkansas.

Route description
Highway 104 begins at US 270 and runs due north as a section line road to an interchange with I-530/US 65. North of this interchange the route has a junction with Highway 365, where it terminates. This northern terminus is at the edge of the Pine Bluff Arsenal.

Despite being an entirely north–south alignment, the highway ends in an even number and therefore is considered east–west by the Arkansas State Highway and Transportation Department (AHTD). The route is entirely two-lane undivided.

Major intersections

See also

 List of state highways in Arkansas

References

External links

104
Transportation in Jefferson County, Arkansas